Era Garafovna Ziganshina (born February 1, 1944) is a Soviet and Russian film and stage actress, People's Artist of Russia (2005).

Biography 
Ziganshina was born in Kazan, USSR. She studied at drama school at the Tovstonogov Bolshoi Drama Theater in Leningrad (now Saint Petersburg). From 1965 to 1976 he worked at the Baltic House Festival Theatre (with a break in 1970 he worked at the Russian drama theater in Chisinau).

References

External links
 

1944 births
Actors from Kazan
Living people
Soviet film actresses
Soviet television actresses
Soviet stage actresses
Russian film actresses
Russian television actresses
Russian stage actresses
People's Artists of Russia
Honored Artists of the RSFSR
Tatar people of Russia
20th-century Russian actresses